Eri Jabotinsky (also transliterated Ari, 26 December 1910 – 6 June 1969) was a Revisionist Zionist activist, Israeli politician and academic mathematician. He was the son of Ze'ev Jabotinsky, the founder of the opposition movement within Zionism at the time, and later served in the Knesset between 1949 and 1951, as a member of the opposition Herut party of Menachem Begin.  Following his break with the party, he pursued his academic career.

Biography
Jabotinsky was born in Odessa in the Russian Empire in 1910. In 1919, the family aliyah to British-controlled Palestine. Between 1933 and 1935 he worked as an engineer in an aircraft factory. In 1935 he returned to Palestine, and worked as an engineer at the Naharayim power station in the Jordan Valley.

A long-term member of Revisionism's Betar youth movement, he became one of its representative leaders in 1936, and joined its worldwide board two years later. With Betar and the party's military wing, Irgun, he helped coordinate illegal Jewish immigration into Palestine; he was arrested by the British authorities in 1940. Upon his release he moved to the United States, where his father died suddenly about the same time. There, together with Hillel Kook's 'Bergson Boys', Aryeh Ben-Eliezer, Shmuel Merlin and Yitzhak Ben-Ami, they founded the Emergency Committee to Save European Jewry, among others.  He briefly returned to Palestine, but was again arrested by the British and expelled for illegal activities in 1944.

Following Israel's independence, he returned in 1948, and was elected to the first Knesset the following year, as a member of the Herut party's list of candidates.  On 20 February 1951 however, Jabotinsky and Hillel Kook left Herut, and sat as independents for the rest of the term, although the move was not recognised by the house committee; this followed on-going disagreements over the party’s direction and its new leadership by Menachem Begin.

After leaving the Knesset, he was awarded a PhD in mathematics in 1957 from the Hebrew University of Jerusalem. He also lectured on electricity theory at the Technion between 1955 and his death in 1969.

He was the father-in-law of Anatoly Rubin.

Academic publications

References

External links

1910 births
1969 deaths
Odesa Jews
Ukrainian emigrants to Mandatory Palestine
20th-century Israeli engineers
Israeli educators
20th-century Israeli Jews
Academic staff of Technion – Israel Institute of Technology
Hebrew University of Jerusalem alumni
20th-century Israeli mathematicians
Ze'ev Jabotinsky
Betar members
Herut politicians
Members of the 1st Knesset (1949–1951)